The Pensions Act 1995 (c 26) is a piece of United Kingdom legislation to improve the running of pension schemes.

Background
Following the death of Robert Maxwell, it became clear that he had embezzled a large amount of money from the pension fund of Mirror Group Newspapers. As a result of this, a review was established to look into ways that the running of pension schemes could be improved. The end result was the Pensions Act 1995.

Overview
The main features of the Act included:

 The establishment of the Occupational Pensions Regulatory Authority
 The Minimum Funding Requirement (MFR) to ensure that all pension schemes had a minimum amount of money
 A compensation fund for pension schemes in the event of fraud
 Protection for existing pension scheme benefits so that they could not be reduced in the future without member consent
 A requirement for pension schemes to have member nominated trustees
 Greater disclosure of information to members
 The introduction of clear documentation showing what should be paid into a scheme, and monitoring of those contributions
 A minimum rate of increase to apply once in payment to pension earned after the date on which the Act came into force

Many of the features introduced by the Act were abolished or amended by the Pensions Act 2004. The MFR was heavily criticised in the Myners Report (2001), which was a HM Treasury sponsored report into institutional investment in the UK. The Myners Report identified three problems with the MFR:

 For some pension funds, the level of assets under the MFR was insufficient to provide the benefits promised by the scheme
 Regulatory costs for sponsoring firms increased without any reduction in the risks of fund insolvency
 Sponsoring firms focused on meeting the narrow requirements of the MFR, rather than on ensuring that the scheme was appropriately funded.

The Pensions Act 2004 replaced the MFR from September 2005 with a new scheme-specific "statutory funding objective" (SFO), allowing more flexibility to individual schemes' circumstances whilst at the same time protecting members' benefits. The Act established the Pension Regulator with the power to require sponsoring companies to fully fund their pension liabilities, by adopting an appropriate recovery strategy consistent with the SFO. Liu and Tonks (2012) examine the effect of a company's pension commitments on its dividend and investment policies, assessing the impact of funding rules under the MFR, and also under the funding requirements introduced under the Pensions Act 2004. They find a strong negative relationship between a firm's dividend payments and its pension contributions, but a weaker effect on investments. They found that dividend and investment sensitivities to pension contributions were more pronounced after the introduction of the Pensions Act 2004.

State pensions
The Act also affects state pensions . A significant change was the phasing in of equalisation of state pension ages for men and women over a ten-year period.

Notes

References
R Goode, Pension Law Reform (HMSO 1993) Cmnd 2342
E McGaughey, A Casebook on Labour Law (Hart 2019) ch 6(4)

External links
Pensions Act 1995

Pensions in the United Kingdom
United Kingdom Acts of Parliament 1995